Unión Deportiva Casetas is a Spanish football team based in Casetas, Zaragoza, in the autonomous community of Aragon. Founded in 1922, it plays in Regional Preferente – Group 3, holding home matches at Campo Municipal de Fútbol San Miguel, which has a capacity of 1,000 people.

History
Founded in 1922, Casetas played the most of their history in the regional leagues until achieving promotion to Tercera División in 1992. The club quickly established themselves in the division, also playing in Segunda División B during the 1994–95 campaign.

Casetas returned to the third division in 2003, being immediately relegated back. In 2007 the club suffered another relegation, only returning to the fourth division in 2018 but still lasting only one season.

Club background
 Unión Deportiva Casetas (1920–48)
 Unión Deportiva Cerámica Casetas (1948–53)
 Unión Deportiva Casetas (1953–present)

Season to season

2 seasons in Segunda División B
14 seasons in Tercera División

References

External links
 
ArefePedia team profile 
Soccerway team profile

Football clubs in Aragon
Association football clubs established in 1922
1922 establishments in Spain